Antonio Valentin Raquiza (February 29, 1908 – December 24, 1999) was a Filipino politician and lawyer. He was from Piddig, Ilocos Norte.

Political career
Raquiza served as representative of the 1st District of Ilocos Norte in the Philippine House of Representatives from 1949 to 1955, 1957 to 1966 and as a mambabatas pambansa from Region I from 1978 to 1984 and from Ilocos Norte from 1984 to 1986. He became governor of Ilocos Norte from 1955 to 1957. He was appointed by former President Ferdinand Marcos as Secretary of Public Works, Transportation and Communications from 1966 to 1968. He was one of the delegates in 1971 Constitutional Convention.

Personal life
He was born on February 29, 1908, to Canuto Raquiza and Benilda Valentin. He died on December 24, 1999. He was interred at Libingan ng mga Bayani in Taguig, Metro Manila.

References

Ilocano people
Governors of Ilocos Norte
20th-century Filipino politicians
20th-century Filipino lawyers
Ferdinand Marcos administration cabinet members
Members of the Batasang Pambansa
1908 births
1999 deaths
Burials at the Libingan ng mga Bayani
Secretaries of Public Works and Highways of the Philippines
Members of the House of Representatives of the Philippines from Ilocos Norte
Kilusang Bagong Lipunan politicians
University of the Philippines College of Law alumni